Maud Margaret 'Mall' Molesworth  (née Mutch; 18 October 1894 – 9 July 1985) was a tennis player from Queensland, Australia who won the inaugural Australasian Championships women's singles title in 1922 and successfully defended her title in 1923.

Tennis career

She won her first major tennis title in 1914 – the Queensland ladies doubles. For much of the next five years, sporting contests in Australia were cancelled due to World War I.

Molesworth won tennis championships in New South Wales, Victoria, South Australia, and Tasmania beginning in 1919. At the first Australian Championships in 1922, Molesworth defeated fellow Australian Esna Boyd Robertson 6–3, 10–8 in the final. A year later, she successfully defended her title, again defeating Robertson in the final.

Molesworth was unable to compete overseas until 1934 when, at age 40, she reached the last sixteen of the French Championships. At the 1934 Wimbledon Championships she lost in the first round of the singles event to Madzy Rollin Couquerque and reached the third round of the doubles with Joan Hartigan.

In doubles, Molesworth won three women's titles at the Australian Championships with Emily Hood Westacott, in 1930, 1933, and 1934. She was also runner-up in women's and mixed doubles at the Australian Championships in 1923.

Molesworth was the first Australian woman tennis player to be listed in the world's top ten rankings. A. Wallis Myers of the Daily Telegraph rated her No. 10 in 1922 and 1923.

In 1924, mainly for health reasons, Molesworth retired from the sport. She came back a few years later, always considered a threat in Australian tournaments. In 1934, she reached the Australian singles final once more. Later that year, she competed overseas for the first time, playing at Wimbledon and the French Championships.

Retirement
After her retirement from competitive play, Molesworth became one of the first female professional coaches in Australia. Until her death in 1985, she maintained a lifelong interest in the sport of tennis.

In the 1972 Queen's Birthday Honours Molesworth received the British Empire Medal (BEM) for "service to the community of Ku-ring-gai, New South Wales.

Personal
On 19 June 1918, in Brisbane, Molesworth married Bevil Hugh Molesworth (1891–1971), an educator and radio broadcaster.

Molesworth died at her home in Lindfield on 9 July 1985. Her only son, Hugh (born 1925), predeceased her in 1960. On 25 January 2022 Maude Margaret Molesworth and Joan Hartigan were inducted into the Australian Tennis Hall of Fame at a special ceremony at Rod Laver Arena.

Grand Slam finals

Singles: 3 (2 titles, 1 runner-up)

Doubles: 4 (4 titles)

Mixed doubles: 1 (1 runner-up)

Grand Slam singles tournament timeline

1Through 1923, the French Championships were open only to French nationals. The World Hard Court Championships (WHCC), actually played on clay in Paris or Brussels, began in 1912 and were open to all nationalities. The results from the 1922 and 1923 editions of that tournament are shown here. The Olympics replaced the WHCC in 1924, as the Olympics were held in Paris. Beginning in 1925, the French Championships were open to all nationalities, with the results shown here beginning with that year.

See also
 Performance timelines for all female tennis players who reached at least one Grand Slam final

References

Australasian Championships (tennis) champions
Australian Championships (tennis) champions
Australian female tennis players
Tennis players from Brisbane
1894 births
1985 deaths
Grand Slam (tennis) champions in women's singles
Grand Slam (tennis) champions in women's doubles
Recipients of the British Empire Medal
19th-century Australian women
20th-century Australian women
Sportswomen from Queensland